Khiara Keating (born 27 June 2004) is an association football goalkeeper who currently plays for WSL side Manchester City. Playing for Manchester United until the age of 11 she moved across to their city rivals in 2015. After a handful of appearances on the bench for City during the 2020–21 season she was loaned out to FA Women's National League North's Fylde at the start of the next. Due to a long injury list at Manchester City however she was recalled after a short period and a few appearances as cover for more senior players. She made her debut for the side on 12 January 2022, starting in a FA Women's League Cup against Leicester City. A few days later on 16 January 2022 she made her league debut with 90 minutes against Aston Villa. Internationally she made one appearance for England under-15's and made her debut for the under 19 side against the Republic of Ireland on 20 October 2021.

In January 2023, Keating joined Coventry United on loan until the end of the 2022–23 Women's Championship season.

Honours

Club
Manchester City
 FA Women's League Cup: 2021–22

References

Living people
2004 births
English women's footballers
England women's youth international footballers
Women's association football goalkeepers
Women's Super League players
Manchester City W.F.C. players
Coventry United W.F.C. players